12th ADG Awards
February 18, 2008

Contemporary Film: 
 No Country for Old Men 

Fantasy Film: 
 The Golden Compass 

Period Film: 
 There Will Be Blood 

The 12th Art Directors Guild Awards, given on February 18, 2008, honored the best art directors of 2007.

Winners and nominees

Film
 Contemporary Film:
 Jess Gonchor – No Country for Old Men
Peter Wenham – The Bourne Ultimatum
Michel Eric and Laurent Ott – The Diving Bell and the Butterfly (Le scaphandre et le papillon)
Carlos Conti – The Kite Runner
Kevin Thompson – Michael Clayton

 Fantasy Film:
 Dennis Gassner – The Golden Compass
James D. Bissell – 300
Stuart Craig – Harry Potter and the Order of the Phoenix
Rick Heinrichs – Pirates of the Caribbean: At World's End
Harley Jessup – Ratatouille

 Period Film:
 Jack Fisk – There Will Be Blood
Arthur Max – American Gangster
Sarah Greenwood – Atonement
Guy Hendrix Dyas – Elizabeth: The Golden Age
Dante Ferretti – Sweeney Todd: The Demon Barber of Fleet Street

Television
 Single-Camera Series:
 Dan Bishop – Mad Men (for "Shoot")
Ruth Ammon – Heroes (for "Five Years Gone")
Zack Grobler – Lost (for "Through the Looking Glass")
Michael Wylie – Pushing Daisies (for "Pie Lette (Pilot)")
Mark Worthington – Ugly Betty (for "East Side Story")

 Multi-Camera Series:
 John Sabato – Mad TV (for "Mad TV")
Bernard Vyzga – Back to You (for "Pilot")
Stephan Olson – How I Met Your Mother (for "Something Blue")
Bernard Vyzga – Rules of Engagement (for "Fix Ups and Downs")
John S. Shaffner – Two and a Half Men (for "Is There a Mrs. Waffles?")

 Miniseries or Television Film:
 Tom Meyer – Pu-239
Marek Dobrowolski – The Company
Tracey Gallacher – The Starter Wife

External links
 The winners and nominees on the official website

2007 film awards
2007 guild awards
Art Directors Guild Awards
2008 in American cinema